John Young Sangster (29 May 1896 – 26 March 1977) was a British industrialist and philanthropist. He was an important figure in the British motorcycle industry, where he was involved with Ariel, BSA and Triumph.

Early life
Sangster was born in Kings Norton, Worcestershire, England. He was the second of three sons of Charles Thomas Brock Sangster, an engineer and the owner of Cycle Components Ltd, which became known as the motorcycle brand Ariel in 1902.

After his education at Hurstpierpoint College, Sussex, Sangster started an engineering apprenticeship. It was interrupted by the First World War, in which Sangster served with the City of Birmingham battalion of the 14th Royal Warwickshire Regiment. His elder brother Fredrick Charles Sangster was killed in action in 1916.

Career

In 1918 Sangster joined the Cycle Components Manufacturing Company, where his father was managing director. He designed a small low-cost car that the company began manufacturing. The car's design was later sold to the Rover Company in Coventry, and Sangster joined Rover to manage the production of the car which became the Rover 8.

In 1923 Sangster returned to his father's company, and by 1930 was joint managing director with him. In 1932 Cycle Components went bankrupt. Sangster bought most of the company's assets and started a new company, Ariel Motors, which he developed with some of CC's former designers and engineers, including Val Page and Bert Hopwood, and later Edward Turner.

Sangster developed a motorcycle with a 4 hp White and Poppe engine which proved extremely successful. He added 586 cc and 992 cc machines to the company's line, setting the standard for competitions at the time.

In 1936 Sangster bought the financially struggling Triumph Cycles company renamed it Triumph Engineering Co., and brought in Edward Turner from Ariel to improve its product range. The Triumph Speed Twin, with a parallel-twin engine designed by Turner, was introduced in 1938, and was followed by a series of successful Triumph motorcycles until the early 1980s.

In 1944 Sangster sold Ariel to the BSA company. In 1951 he sold Triumph to BSA for £2.5 million, a good return on his initial £50,000 investment in1936.

Sangster joined the board of BSA following their acquisition of Triumph. He became chairman of BSA in 1956, after a series of boardroom battles which ousted the previous chairman, Sir Bernard Docker. He appointed Turner as Chief Executive of the Automotive Division (comprising BSA, Ariel, Triumph, Daimler, and Carbodies, makers of London taxicabs). Sangster retired as chairman of BSA in 1961.

He took in two London evacuees, Gordon and Jean Rookledge, in 1944. He declined a peerage in 1962.

Sangster died in Belgravia, London, from cancer on 26 March 1977.

References

External links
Oxford Dictionary of National Biography: Sangster, John Young by Barbara M.D. Smith.

1896 births
1977 deaths
British Army personnel of World War I
British motorcycle pioneers
Deaths from cancer in England
Daimler people
People from Kings Norton
People educated at Hurstpierpoint College
20th-century English businesspeople